Thomas S. Hanson (born September 14, 1939) is a retired American teacher and Democratic politician.  He served three terms in the Wisconsin State Assembly in the 1970s.

Biography
Hanson was born on September 14, 1939, in Oshkosh, Wisconsin. He attended the University of Wisconsin–La Crosse, the Illinois Institute of Technology, the Stevens Institute of Technology and Marquette University.

Career
Hanson was elected to the Assembly in 1970. He lost re-election in 1972 after redistricting, but subsequently regained his seat in 1974.  He was a Democrat.

References

Politicians from Oshkosh, Wisconsin
Democratic Party members of the Wisconsin State Assembly
University of Wisconsin–La Crosse alumni
Illinois Institute of Technology alumni
Stevens Institute of Technology alumni
Marquette University alumni
1939 births
Living people